Shadow of Leaves is the 36th release by avant- folk/blues singer-songwriter Jandek, released by his own Corwood Industries label (#0774). It is his first release of four released in 2004, and the second album to feature his voice accompanied by solo fretless electric bass, though the lyrics are darker and more personal than the last album.

Track listing

References

2004 albums
Jandek albums
Corwood Industries albums